Vintage Grill & Car Museum is a car museum and restaurant in Weatherford, Texas. It is located at 202 Fort Worth Highway, where it occupies a circa-1930s building that previously housed the McDavid Oldsmobile car dealership and a gas station.

Museum 

The museum features 11 classic and vintage cars. Its collection includes a 1930 Buick, a 1940 LaSalle, a 1948 Studebaker sheriff patrol car, a 1948 Lincoln and a 1964 Lincoln Continental both owned by President Lyndon B. Johnson, a 1975 Trabant, a 1979 Jeep CJ-7 (featuring six-wheel drive), a 1988 Jeep Grand Wagoneer-Dodge Durango hybrid, and a 1997 Pontiac G8 concept car. Also on display are cars featured in the films The Godfather and Pearl Harbor.

Restaurant 

The restaurant bills itself as serving "farm-to-table southern style cuisine", and it sources its produce from the local Weatherford Farmer's Market.

History 

Vintage Grill & Car Museum founder Tom Moncrief, an oilman from Fort Worth, was inspired to create a combination car museum and restaurant after visiting one in Sydney, Australia, while on his honeymoon in 1988. After originally planning to open a 1950s-themed museum in Fort Worth, Moncrief took a suggestion to open it instead in an old service station, purchasing one in Weatherford for the purpose.

The current museum's buildings were built around 1919; by 1921, when the Bankhead Highway arrived in Weatherford, the lot included a 50-car garage, an auto sales and office building, gas pumps, and a repair shop. Before being repurposed as a car museum and restaurant, the property's former gas station also served as Weatherford's Greyhound bus station.

The establishment opened to the public in early 2015.

Vintage Car Museum and Event Center 

On August 4, 2016, the companion Vintage Car Museum and Event Center opened one block west of Vintage Grill & Car Museum, at 100 Fort Worth Highway. The Museum and Event Center is located in the  Hobson Building, which allows Moncrief to display more of his car collections, which is curated by Shana Akins. The Event Center walls are the original 1886 rock walls while the building was still a livery stable and can accommodate over 200 people.

Gallery

References

External links 

 

Automobile museums in Texas
Restaurants in Texas
Buildings and structures in Parker County, Texas